Jesús Manuel "Chiki" Meza Moreno (born 6 January 1986) is a Venezuelan footballer. He plays as an attacking midfielder for Academia Puerto Cabello.

Club career
Born in Mérida, he grew up in a small neighborhood of the town. Since a boy he showed interest in common sports like Basketball and Baseball, but his major interest was directed to Football, as his father was a great lover of that sport and influenced him to practice it. Meza started playing professionally at Estudiantes de Mérida, making his debut in the top level Venezuelan league at age 16.

After a few team changes in Venezuela, in summer 2008 he signed with Al-Ittihad Aleppo, although he never managed to play because the Syrian team had full quota for foreign players. In half season, Meza returned to Venezuela to sign for Zamora FC.

With the squad he won the 2011 Torneo Clausura, but Zamora failed to complete the national title against Deportivo Táchira. At the end of the season, he was transferred to Mexican side Club Atlas. He made his debut on 7 August 2011, in a 0–0 draw against Toluca.

However, Meza did not managed to make himself a spot in the Mexican squad, and on 26 December 2011 the team agreed a free transfer to Venezuelan giants Caracas FC. He signed a contract that will run until 2013. On 18 March 2012, he scored a goal described as "maradonian", in a league match against Aragua FC.

Meza signed on 6 June 2013 with Qatari side Al-Arabi SC.

International career
He made his debut in 2007 in a friendly match against Cuba. In 2011, he was called again to play two matches in preparation for the 2011 Copa América, making the final cut in the squad.

Club statistics
Accurate as of 11 January 2014. Data prior to 2006–07 season need to be confirmed.

1Includes two matches of the championship final in 2010–11 season.

References

External links 

1986 births
Living people
Association football midfielders
Venezuelan footballers
Venezuela international footballers
Venezuelan expatriate footballers
Expatriate footballers in Mexico
Expatriate footballers in Qatar
Expatriate footballers in the United Arab Emirates
Expatriate footballers in Greece
Expatriate footballers in Hungary
Estudiantes de Mérida players
Monagas S.C. players
Al-Ittihad Aleppo players
Zamora FC players
Caracas FC players
Atlas F.C. footballers
Al-Arabi SC (Qatar) players
Al-Shaab CSC players
Olympiacos Volos F.C. players
Budapest Honvéd FC players
Aragua FC players
Venezuelan Primera División players
Liga MX players
Qatar Stars League players
Nemzeti Bajnokság I players
Football League (Greece) players
2011 Copa América players
UAE Pro League players
Liga Dominicana de Fútbol players
Cibao FC players
Venezuelan expatriate sportspeople in Mexico
Venezuelan expatriate sportspeople in Qatar
Venezuelan expatriate sportspeople in the United Arab Emirates
Venezuelan expatriate sportspeople in Greece
Venezuelan expatriate sportspeople in Hungary
People from Mérida, Mérida